Mario Álvarez may refer to:
Mario Roberto Álvarez (1913–2011), Argentinean architect
Mario Álvarez Dugan (1931–2008), Dominican journalist
Mario Álvarez (table tennis), represented Dominican Republic at the 1988 Summer Olympics and participated in table tennis at the Pan American Games
Pedro Mario Álvarez (born 1982), Spanish football player
Mario Álvarez (singer) (born 1985), Spanish singer and winner of 7th series of Operación Triunfo